Sneha Devi (1916, in Jorhat – 5 October 1990) was an Indian writer of Assamese literature. She was awarded a posthumous Sahitya Akademi Award in 1990.

References 

1916 births
1990 deaths
Indian writers
Women writers from Assam
Recipients of the Sahitya Akademi Award in Assamese